The Melges 17 is an American scow-hulled sailing dinghy that was designed by Reichel/Pugh as a one-design racer and first built in 2005.

Production
The design has built by Melges Performance Sailboats in the United States since 2005 and remains in production.

Design
The design was conceived to provide a boat for youth sailors to move up to from the Laser, 420 and the X Boat, as well as for adults couples to sail.

The Melges 17 is a racing sailboat, with the hull built predominantly of fiberglass. It has a fractional sloop rig with carbon fiber spars; a scow hull; a transom-hung, aluminum extrusion rudder controlled by a tiller with an extension and twin retractable, aluminum extrusion bilgeboards.

With both bilgeboards retracted it can be operated in shallow water, beached or transported on a boat trailer.

Operational history
The boat was at one time supported by a class club that organized racing events, the Melges 17 Class Association.

See also
List of sailing boat types

Similar sailboats
M Scow

References

External links

Dinghies
2000s sailboat type designs
One-design sailing classes
Sailboat type designs by Reichel/Pugh
Sailboat types built by Melges Performance Sailboats